Halewijn can have several meanings:

Halewijn, a hamlet in Luchteren, Belgium
Halluin or Halewijn, a commune in the Nord department, France
Halewijn, a character in the Dutch folksong "Heer Halewijn" (Dutch for "Lord Halewijn")
Halewijn, an opera based on the Dutch folksong, see Heer Halewijn